Hard Candy is the fourth studio album by American rock band Counting Crows, released in the United Kingdom on July 7, 2002, and the following day in the United States.

The album features the hidden track "Big Yellow Taxi", a Joni Mitchell cover. This was one of their biggest radio hits from the album; re-releases were revised to mention the song. Originally the song did not include Vanessa Carlton and the standard version caught the ear of a producer who added it to the movie Two Weeks Notice adding Carlton's voice to the track. This version topped the VH-1 charts and American Top 40 for a while. A new version of the song "Holiday in Spain", recorded as a duet in English and Dutch with Dutch band BLØF, became a number-one hit in the Netherlands.

Reception
Reviews hailed the album as the best release since their debut, with the albums of the mid-1990s being "long, and drawn out", likely due to Duritz's state of mind at that time, one reviewer happily announced that, "Hard Candy is crisp and tight, packed with three- and four-minute shots of radio friendly fare", and that during a time when hard rock is the standard, the band are not afraid of a sound that is in the title track, compared to the Byrds, and with its "Allman-esque" twin guitars, echoes The Band in "If I Could Give All My Love (Richard Manuel Is Dead)".  The album has received a score of 69 out of 100 based on "generally favorable reviews" from Metacritic.

However, the cover of "Big Yellow Taxi" was met with searing criticism, with The Village Voice naming it the worst song of the 2000s: Additionally, NME also included this cover on its list of the worst songs of the 2000s, and Ultimate Classic Rock highlighted this song in its Terrible Classic Rock Covers series.

Track listing
All tracks written by Adam F. Duritz unless otherwise indicated. The song "Big Yellow Taxi" was written by Joni Mitchell, who is credited in the liner notes with the passage "May contain trace amounts of Joni Mitchell"
"Hard Candy" (Duritz, Daniel J. Vickrey, Charles Gillingham) – 4:20
"American Girls" – 4:32
"Good Time" – 4:24
"If I Could Give All My Love (Richard Manuel Is Dead)" (Duritz, Vickrey, David Immerglück, Gillingham, Matt Malley) – 3:52
"Goodnight L.A." – 4:17
"Butterfly in Reverse" (Duritz, Ryan Adams, Gillingham) – 2:48
"Miami" (Duritz, Gillingham, Immerglück) – 5:01
"New Frontier" – 3:51
"Carriage" – 4:04
"Black and Blue" – 3:53
"Why Should You Come When I Call?" (Duritz, Gillingham) – 4:38
"Up All Night (Frankie Miller Goes to Hollywood)" – 5:07
"Holiday in Spain" – 3:50
"Big Yellow Taxi" (Joni Mitchell) – 3:47 [Original issue hidden track]

2006 revised edition
"4 White Stallions" (Jeff Trott, Vickrey, Patrick Winningham) – 4:21
"Big Yellow Taxi" (Single Version, featuring Vanessa Carlton) (Mitchell) – 3:47

United Kingdom release
"4 White Stallions" (Jeff Trott, Vickery, Patrick Winningham) – 4:21
"You Ain't Going Nowhere" (Bob Dylan) – 8:43
"Big Yellow Taxi" (Joni Mitchell) – 3:47 [Original issue hidden track]

United Kingdom 2003 re-release
"4 White Stallions" (Jeff Trott, Vickery, Patrick Winningham) – 4:21
"You Ain't Going Nowhere" (Bob Dylan) – 3:44
"Big Yellow Taxi" (Single Version, featuring Vanessa Carlton) (Mitchell) – 3:47

Japanese release
"4 White Stallions" (Jeff Trott, Vickrey, Patrick Winningham) – 4:21
"You Ain't Going Nowhere" (Bob Dylan) – 3:44
"Start Again" (Norman Blake)  – 3:34
"Big Yellow Taxi" (Mitchell) – 3:47 [Original issue hidden track]

Japanese 2003 re-release
"4 White Stallions" (Jeff Trott, Vickrey, Patrick Winningham) – 4:21
"You Ain't Going Nowhere" (Bob Dylan) – 3:44
"Start Again" (Norman Blake)  – 3:34
"Big Yellow Taxi" (Single Version, featuring Vanessa Carlton) (Mitchell) – 3:47

Personnel
Counting Crows
Dave Bryson – acoustic guitar, electric guitar
Adam Duritz – piano, vocals, horn arrangements, string arrangements, string samples
Charlie Gillingham – synthesizer, piano, oboe, Hammond organ, Mellotron, Omnichord, Fender Rhodes, horn arrangements, string arrangements, Wurlitzer, tack piano, vocals
David Immerglück – acoustic guitar, bass, mandolin, electric guitar, vocals, slide guitar, electric sitar
Matt Malley – bass, vocals, upright bass
Ben Mize – drums, percussion, vocals, drum loops
Dan Vickrey – acoustic guitar, banjo, electric guitar, vocals

Additional musicians
Ryan Adams – backing vocalist on "Butterfly In Reverse"
Vanessa Carlton - backing vocalist on "Big Yellow Taxi"
Sheryl Crow – backing vocalist on "American Girls"
Dave Gibbs – backing vocalist on "Hard Candy"
Leona Naess – backing vocalist on "Black and Blue"
Matthew Sweet – backing vocalist on "Hard Candy"
Carole Castillo – viola
Jacqueline Brand – violin
Mario deLeon – violin
Brian Dembow – viola
Stephen Erdody – cello
Ron Fair – string arrangements
Richard Feves – bass
Alan Grunfeld – violin
Jerry Hey – flugelhorn, horn arrangements, string arrangements
Paula Hochhalter – cello
Ethan Johns – conga
Karen Jones – violin
Natalie Leggett – violin
Alan Mautner – violin
Ed Meares – bass
Ralph Morrison – violin
Robin Olson – violin
Sara Parkins – violin
Katia Popov – violin
John Scanlon – viola
Tina Soule – cello
Cecilia Tsan – cello
Josephina Vergara – violin

Charts

Weekly charts

Year-end charts

Certifications

References

External links

2002 albums
Albums produced by Steve Lillywhite
Counting Crows albums
Geffen Records albums
Interscope Records albums
Universal Records albums